The 2009 Washington Huskies softball team represented the University of Washington in the 2009 NCAA Division I softball season.  The Huskies were coached by Heather Tarr, who led her fifth season.  The Huskies finished with a record of 51–12.  They played their home games at Husky Softball Stadium and competed in the Pacific-10 Conference, where they finished second with a 14–7 record.

The Huskies were invited to the 2009 NCAA Division I softball tournament, where they won the Amherst Regional, swept the Atlanta Super Regional, and then completed a run through the Women's College World Series to claim their first NCAA Women's College World Series Championship.

Roster

Schedule

References

Washington
Washington Huskies softball seasons
Washington Softball
Women's College World Series seasons
NCAA Division I softball tournament seasons